Conundrum Press is the name of two book publishing companies in North America:
Conundrum Press (Canada)
Conundrum Press (United States)